Gabriel (1940 – May 20, 2016) was the Russian Orthodox bishop.

Notes

1940 births
2016 deaths
Eastern Orthodox metropolitans